Frigga (sometimes called Freyja) is a fictional character appearing in American comic books published by Marvel Comics. The character appears in particular in those featuring the superhero Thor, who is Frigga's son. Based on  both Frigg and Freyja of Norse mythology, she was created by writers Stan Lee and Robert Bernstein and artist Joe Sinnott, and first appeared in Journey into Mystery #92 (May 1963).

Rene Russo portrayed the character in the Marvel Cinematic Universe films Thor (2011), Thor: The Dark World (2013), and Avengers: Endgame (2019).

Publication history
Frigga first appeared in Journey into Mystery #92 (May 1963), and was adapted from mythology by Stan Lee, Robert Bernstein and Joe Sinnott.

The character subsequently appeared in Thor Annual #10 (1982), Thor #344 (June 1984), Marvel Graphic Novel #15 - The Raven Banner (1985), Journey into Mystery #504-505 (Dec. 1996-Jan. 1997), #512-513 (Sept.–Oct. 1997), Thor #26 (Aug. 2000), Loki #3 (Jan. 2004), and Thor: Son of Asgard #7&9 (Aug. 2004-Oct. 2004).

Frigga appeared as part of the "Asgardians" entry in The Official Handbook of the Marvel Universe Deluxe Edition #1.

Fictional character biography
An Asgardian, she is both Queen of Asgard, and the Asgardian gods, the wife of Odin, the step-mother of Thor, the biological mother of Balder, and the adoptive mother of Loki. She is also sometimes described to be a Vanir goddess, as opposed to her husband, who is of the Aesir tribe. She is also the one responsible for casting the spells on Balder to protect him from mortal harm. When Surtur the fire demon threatens all the known realms, Frigga is assigned the guardianship of the children of Asgard. They retreat to a hostel deep in the wintry wilderness of Asgard. Though Frigga does not know it, she is assisted in her guarding by Tiwaz, the great-grandfather of Thor. After Odin and Surtur vanish at the end of the battle, Frigga organizes an 'Althing', where all of Asgard will choose a new ruler. The result is that Balder is chosen as the new ruler.

In addition, Frigga had supervised the location and training of the apprentices to the Celestials, the Young Gods. Because of the events of Ragnarok, Frigga is believed to have suffered the same fate as the rest of the Asgardians.

After Thor recreates Asgard and restores the Asgardians following Ragnarok, it is revealed that she is actually the mother of Balder.

During the "War of the Realms" storyline, Frigga is seen fighting against Malekith's assassins which attracts the attention of Spider-Man. Spider-Man helps defeat most of Malekith's assassins, while Frigga is slightly annoyed by Spider-Man's talking. Sif and her Valkyries meet up with Frigga as most of the Asgardians live on Earth as refugees. As Laufey appears and is about to eat Frigga, Loki arrives and saves his adopted mother. As the superheroes and Asgardians fight the forces of Malekith, Frigga is struggling in her fight against the Queen of Angels. Frigga later makes Jane Foster the All-Mother of Asgard. While resting their injuries, Frigga asks Captain America to assemble a group to help get Thor back. Frigga then leads a team consisting of Blade impersonating a Dark Elf, She-Hulk impersonating a Rock Troll, Ghost Rider posing as a Fire Goblin, and Punisher impersonating a Dark Elf to Svartalheim in order to destroy the Dark Bifrost Bridge. Frigga's group is met with Dark Elves and Punisher opens fire on them. Frigga's group arrives at the Dark Bifrost Bridge, but Frigga realized that the Bifrost Bridge has been destroyed and changes plans in protecting the Dark Bifrost. Frigga grabs the sword that houses the Black Bifrost Bridge, and barely managed to retain her humanity. She sends Punisher to the Light Elves, She-Hulk to Nidavellir (Home of the Dwarves), Blade to Vanaheim (home of the Vanir Gods), and Ghost Rider to Niffleheim (the Land of the Dead) to recruit more allies. Frigga hears that Valkyrie is dead, Captain Marvel and the Agents of Atlas are fighting Fire Goblins in China, the Venom symbiote is being tortured by Malekith, Thor is recuperating, and Laufey is at the ruins of the Statue of Liberty swatting fighter jets. Frigga is busy fighting off the endless hordes when Malekith throws the Venom symbiote as a spear at Frigga's stomach. Before he could kill her, Odin arrives in his new armor and buys time for Frigga to destroy the Black Bifrost Bridge where its blast seemingly kills them both while defeating Malekith's forces. The two of them survived and are held captive by Malekith at Stonehenge. Frigga states to Malekith that he should flee while he still can as Malekith plans to cause the death of Thor. Odin tells Frigga to pray to Thor.

In other media

Television
 Frigga appears in The Super Hero Squad Show episode "Lo! How the Mighty Have Abdicated", voiced by Grey DeLisle.
 Frigga in her Freya alias appears in the Avengers Assemble episode "Downgraded", voiced by Jennifer Hale. This version was the leader of the Vanir of Vanaheim, who used a "Great Light" on top of their village to keep the Shadow Nixes at bay. While attempting to reignite it, she encountered Hawkeye and Falcon, who helped her do so and drive the Shadow Nixes away.

Film
Frigga appears in live-action films set in the Marvel Cinematic Universe, portrayed by Rene Russo. This version is portrayed as Thor's biological mother.
 Frigga is introduced in Thor (2011).
 Russo reprises her role in Thor: The Dark World (2013). Following Loki's imprisonment, Frigga shows sympathy to him by attempting to make his incarceration more hospitable. During the Dark Elves' raid on Asgard, Frigga is killed by Algrim while protecting Jane Foster, and is later given a Viking funeral.
 Frigga appears in an alternate timeline in Avengers: Endgame. In an alternate 2013, Thor runs into Frigga in Asgard, who realizes her son has come from the future. Following a heart-to-heart talk, he tries to warn her about her impending death, but she refuses to hear it, saying she accepts her future and he should focus on fixing his.

Motion comics
Frigga appears in the motion comic Thor & Loki: Blood Brothers, voiced by Deborah Jane McKinley.

References

External links
 
 Frigga at MarvelDirectory.com
 

Characters created by Robert Bernstein
Characters created by Stan Lee
Comics characters introduced in 1963
Female characters in film
Fictional goddesses
Fictional queens
Marvel Comics Asgardians
Marvel Comics characters who use magic
Marvel Comics characters with accelerated healing
Marvel Comics characters with superhuman strength
Superhero film characters